Caramat railway station is located in the town of Caramat, Ontario, Canada. This railway station is currently in use by Via Rail. Transcontinental Canadian trains stop here.

References

External links
 Caramat railway station

Via Rail stations in Ontario
Railway stations in Thunder Bay District
Canadian National Railway stations in Ontario
Canadian Northern Railway stations in Ontario